The Supreme Court of Uganda is the highest judicial organ in Uganda. It derives its powers from Article 130 of the 1995 Constitution. It is primarily an appellate court with original jurisdiction in only one type of case: a presidential election petition.

Location
The Supreme Court Building is located at 10 Upper Kololo, at the corner with Mabua Road, on Kololo Hill. This is in the Central Division of Kampala, Uganda's capital and largest city. The coordinates of the Supreme Court Building are: 0°19'45.0"N, 32°35'23.0"E (Latitude:0.329165; Longitude:32.589725).

Overview
The Supreme Court is headed by the chief justice and has ten other justices. The quorum required for a court decision varies depending on the type of case under consideration. When hearing a constitutional appeal, the required quorum is seven justices. In a criminal or a civil appeal, only five justices are required for a quorum.

In the absence of the chief justice, the most senior member of the court presides. The court sits eight sessions a year with a break of two weeks between sessions to conduct research and write judgments. It has the power to uphold, reverse, substitute its judgment, or order a new trial when hearing an appeal from a lower court.

Composition
As of 08 December 2022, the following justices sat on the Supreme Court:

 Alfonse Owiny-Dollo, Chief Justice of Uganda
 Stella Arach-Amoko
 Esther Mayambala Kitimbo Kisaakye
 Eldad Mwangusya
 Faith Essy Mwondha
 Lillian Tibatemwa-Ekirikubinza
 Paul Mugamba
 Michael Chibita
 Ezekiel Muhanguzi
 Percy Night Tuhaise

Cases heard

Among the controversial cases heard by the Supreme Court was in 2008 when the validity of the death penalty was contested. The case was heard on appeal from the constitutional court. The main appellant was Susan Kigula who has since lost her appeal against her own death sentence for murdering her husband.

Other cases include four of the last five presidential election petitions in which the court ruled 3:2 in 2001, 4:3 in 2006, 5:4 in 2011, and 9:0 in 2016 in favor of President Yoweri Museveni's re-election.

List of chief justices

Republic of Uganda

 Since 2020 Alfonse OWiny-Dollo 
 2015 – 2020 Bart Magunda Katureebe
 2013 – 2015 Steven Kavuma (acting)
 2001 – 2013 Benjamin Josses Odoki
 1986 – 2001 Samuel Wako Wambuzi
 1985 – 1986 Peter Allen
 1980 – 1985 George Masika
 1979 – 1980 Samuel Wako Wambuzi
 1975 – 1979 Mohammed Saied
 1972 – 1975 Samuel Wako Wambuzi
 1971 – 1972 Benedicto Kiwanuka
 1969 – 1971 Dermot Joseph Sheridan
 1963 – 1969 Egbert Udo Udoma
 1962 – 1963 K. G. Bennet (acting)

Uganda Protectorate
1956 – 1962 Audley McKisack
1952 – 1956 John Bowes Griffin
1947 – 1952 David Edwards 
1937 – 1947 Norman Whitley
1935 – 1937 Robert Evans Hall
1935 John Harry Barclay Nihill (acting)
1933 – 1934 Sidney Solomon Abrahams
1921 – 1932 Charles James Griffin 
19nn – 1920 William Morris Carter

See also
Politics of Uganda
Court of Appeal of Uganda
High Court of Uganda

References

External links
The Judiciary of Uganda Homepage
Uganda Online Law Library - Courts and Judicature
Uganda Online Law Library - Supreme Court of Uganda Rules - 76 pp pdf
Uganda Legal Information Institute
Uganda Law Society
East African Law Society

 
Uganda
Judiciary of Uganda
Courts in Uganda